Egil Andersen Hylleraas (May 15, 1898 – October 28, 1965) was a Norwegian theoretical physicist known for creating a method for predicting the ground state energy of two-electron atoms and trial wave functions for many-electron atoms.

Early life and education 
Hylleraas was the son of Ole Andersen, a teacher in the mountain village of Engerdal, located in southern Norway. Hylleraas was the youngest of eleven children. He dropped out of school at a young age but later resumed his education at 17 by attending high school after moving to Oslo. He would later attend the University of Oslo and become a teacher. Hylleraas started research on the double refraction of light after reading a book by Max Born regarding crystal lattices. His paper earned him a fellowship from the International Education Board. From 1926 to 1928, he worked with Max Born at the University of Göttingen.

The Golden Age of Atomic Physics 
In his journal Reminiscences,[1] Hylleraas referred to 1925–1930 as the Golden Age of atomic physics. It was when Bohr's theory of the atom was replaced by the new theory of quantum mechanics. By 1926, the one-electron hydrogen had been solved, and Werner Heisenberg had formulated the two-electron helium problem quantum mechanically. A simple first-order perturbation treatment still yielded considerably increased ionization potential for error with experimental measurement.[2] Max Born considered it crucial for quantum mechanics to provide a result in better agreement with experiments.

When Hylleraas arrived at Göttingen, he learned that Max Born had abandoned crystallography. He continued Max Born's work on crystals independently. Still, he was assigned to work on the helium problem when Bohr's student became ill. Hylleraas modified the first attempt in two ways: he replaced the incomplete bound state hydrogenic functions with the complete Laguerre functions. He reduced the number of coordinates from 6 to 3, namely the distances of the two electrons from the nucleus and the angle between the position vectors of the two electrons. He obtained results in much better agreement with the experiments with a mechanical desk calculator. The result was well received, but the discrepancy of 0.12 eV continued to bother him. A breakthrough was achieved in 1928 when Hylleraas realized the angle coordinate needed to be replaced by the distance between the two electrons. With only three terms in the wave function expansion, the error had been reduced to 0.03 eV, with six terms to 0.01 eV. His work was quickly applied to other two-electron atoms and the hydrogen molecule. 

Hylleraas was one of the founding fathers of CERN and represented Norway at the European Council for Nuclear Research [3], which later led to the organization's establishment.

Awards
 Gunnerus Medal (1960)

Selected publications
 
  (over 1830 citations)

See also
Two-electron atom
Hylleraas co-ordinates
Hylleraas configuration interaction  (Hy-CI or H-CI)

Notes

External links

 Hylleraas, Egil Andersen Scientific Biography 
Superraske datamaskiner bruker Egil Hylleraas matematiske metoder [Superfast computers use Hylleraas mathematical methods]

1898 births
1965 deaths
People from Engerdal
Norwegian physicists
Theoretical physicists
People associated with CERN
Members of the Royal Swedish Academy of Sciences